Haloplanus natans is a halophilic Archaeon in the family of Halobacteriaceae and the type species of the genus Haloplanus. It was isolated from controlled mesocosms with a mixture of water from the Dead Sea and the Red Sea.

References

External links 

Type strain of Haloplanus natans at BacDive -  the Bacterial Diversity Metadatabase

Euryarchaeota
Archaea described in 2007